Escalona del Prado is a municipality located in the province of Segovia, Castile and León, Spain. In 2009, the municipality has a population of 606.

References

Municipalities in the Province of Segovia